The banded rainbowfish (Melanotaenia trifasciata), also known as the Jewel rainbowfish, Goyder River rainbowfish, three-striped sunfish or regal rainbowfish, is a species of Rainbowfish found in the northerly regions of North Australia and Queensland. an adult Banded Rainbowfish can reach a stranded length of 15 cm -12 cm with a deep body usually exceeding 1/3 of their body length, like most Rainbowfish banded Rainbowfish vary in colour depending on where they were collected, but all variety's have a distinct dark mid-lateral band and bright red/yellow Dorsal, anal, and caudal fins.

Behavior 

The banded rainbowfish is an active shoaling fish, that typically occurs in the surface and mid-level areas of fresh water environments.

As seasonal spawners the banded rainbowfish breed intermittently throughout the year, males compete with one another for territory and female attention in contests where they compare body coloration and size buy swimming side by side whilst extending their fins too appear larger.

After mating females can produce between 200-500 eggs which they affix to vegetation using adhesive threads after which it leaves, the male will continue to guard their territory and by extension the eggs until they hatch 6–7 days later.

Habitat and diet 
The banded rainbowfish lives in a wide variety of habitats, such as rivers, lagoons and slow moving streams and prefers areas with strong water flow, sandy substrate, dense sub surface vegetation and submerged logs and branches.

Banded rainbow fish are opportunistic omnivores, the bulk of their diet being arthropods such as aquatic insects, arachnids and crustaceans as well as algae and terrestrial insects that have drowned on the water surface such as green ants.

Etymology 
The name Melanotaenia trifasciata was proposed by Hialmar Rendahl in 1922 while describing the species; the name Trifasciata means "three-banded", however live individuals do not typically have more than a single "band".  This discrepancy is due to the original museum specimen described by Hialmar, which had its pattern altered by being preserved in spirits.

In captivity 

Rainbowfish are relatively new to the aquarium hobby, and were up until recently kept by only a small group of hobbyists they have since seen a significant rise in popularity owing to their generally colorful patterns, energetic behavior and ease of care, the banded Rainbowfish itself is exemplary of these traits a hardy and peaceful shoaling fish, they make easy editions to most peaceful community aquariums and can tolerate a wide range of water parameters, like most Rainbowfish the banded Rainbowfish should be kept in an aquarium with a lid as they are capable of jumping out.

References 

banded rainbowfish
Freshwater fish of Australia
banded rainbowfish